The Eastern Eye is a British weekly newspaper. It was created in 1989 and was first published by The Guardian, before becoming a standalone newspaper.

History 
Sarwar Ahmed founded the Eastern Eye from his bedroom in 1989. Announcing itself as the newspaper "for the Asian perspective", Eastern Eye reportedly sold 30,000 copies a week nationwide in its first year. In 1996, the newspaper started compiling and publishing a list of "Britain's Richest Asians 200". In mid-2008, the circulation was about 20,000.

Its ownership subsequently changed several times. It was part of the Trinity Mirror Group before a management buyout and the creation of the Ethnic Media Group (EMG). The EMG also published Asian Times, New Nation and Caribbean Times, incorporating African Times.

In 2009, Eastern Eye was sold to the Asian Media & Marketing Group, presently known as Asian Media Group (AMG).

AMG has continued the title's tradition of publishing the annual Asian Rich List and staging the Asian Business Awards every year, as well as publishing its "30 Global Asian Stars" and "Top 50 Asian Celebrities" lists.

References

External links

1989 establishments in the United Kingdom
Newspapers established in 1989
Newspapers published in London
Weekly newspapers published in the United Kingdom
National newspapers published in the United Kingdom